Tere-Kholsky District (Tere-Xöl kojuun) is an administrative and municipal district (raion, or kozhuun), one of the seventeen in the Tuva Republic, Russia. It is located in the southeast of the republic. Its administrative center is the rural locality (a selo) of Kungurtug. Population:  1,835 (2002 Census). The population of Kungurtug accounts for 77.9% of the district's total population.

History
The district was established in 2003 when it was split from Kyzylsky District.

References

Notes

Sources

Districts of Tuva
States and territories established in 2003

pl:Kożuun barun-chiemczycki
